Rolando Blanco (born 29 December 1972) is a Guatemalan sprinter. He competed in the men's 4 × 100 metres relay at the 2000 Summer Olympics.

References

1972 births
Living people
Athletes (track and field) at the 2000 Summer Olympics
Guatemalan male sprinters
Olympic athletes of Guatemala
Athletes (track and field) at the 1999 Pan American Games
Pan American Games competitors for Guatemala
Place of birth missing (living people)
Central American and Caribbean Games bronze medalists for Guatemala
Competitors at the 2002 Central American and Caribbean Games
Central American Games gold medalists for Guatemala
Central American Games medalists in athletics
Central American Games silver medalists for Guatemala
Central American and Caribbean Games medalists in athletics